Bruley is a commune in the Meurthe-et-Moselle department in northeastern France.

Bruley is notable for its wine production.

Population

Personalities
 Jean-Baptiste Vatelot (1688 – 1748), the canon who founded the Sisters of the Christian Doctrine (Nancy) and the grandson of the Maire [Mayor] of Bruley, François Vatelot (1636 – 1697)
 Claude Manet, the current Mayor of Bruley
 Marcel Laroppe, the former manager of the Société Vinicole du Toulois

See also
Communes of the Meurthe-et-Moselle department
Parc naturel régional de Lorraine

References

Communes of Meurthe-et-Moselle